Tom Rüsz Jacobsen (born 20 February 1953 in Tjølling) is a retired Norwegian footballer. He was a goalkeeper, and played 26 matches for Norway. He won the league two times and the Norwegian Cup one time with Vålerenga.

Club career
Jacobsen played for Vålerenga from 1980 until he retired. He played 100 league games, and conceded 42 goals - even though he managed a clean sheet in 42 of the 99 games he started. He was elected Man of the Match by VG 10 times. In his 99th league game, he was injured and needed to be taken off the field. In order to get 100 league games, he played the last two minutes of the next game - with a broken arm.

Jacobsen won Norwegian First Division three times, and the Norwegian Football Cup one time with Vålerenga. In the semifinal of the 1980 Norwegian Football Cup, he secured a rematch when he saved Ståle Klubnes's shot with only seconds left of the game. Vålerenga won the rematch against Mo IL, and qualified for the final where they won 4–1 against Lillestrøm SK

International career
Tom Rüsz Jacobsen was capped 26 times for Norway. He made his debut against Soviet Union on 24 September 1979, while he was still played for third-tier team Fram Larvik. In his first seven international matches, Norway did not score a single goal. His last international appearance was against Yugoslavia on 12 October 1983.

Jacobsen's best performance on the national team, was against Switzerland in Bern on 29 October 1980, when Norway won 2–1 and he was elected Man of the Match by VG with 10 points of 10 possible.

Honours
Vålerenga Fotball
Norwegian Premier League Championship (2): 1981, 1983
Norwegian Football Cup (1): 1980

References

1953 births
Living people
People from Larvik
Norwegian footballers
Eliteserien players
Norway international footballers
Bryne FK players
Vålerenga Fotball players
Association football goalkeepers
Sportspeople from Vestfold og Telemark